The American Society for Mass Spectrometry (ASMS) is a professional association based in the United States that supports the scientific field of mass spectrometry. As of 2018, the society had approximately 10,000 members primarily from the US, but also from around the world. The society holds a large annual meeting, typically in late May or early June as well as other topical conferences and workshops. The society publishes the Journal of the American Society for Mass Spectrometry.

Awards
The Society recognizes achievements and promotes academic research through four annual awards. The Biemann Medal and the John B. Fenn Award for a Distinguished Contribution in Mass Spectrometry both are awarded in recognition of singular achievements or contributions in fundamental or applied mass spectrometry, with the Biemann Medal being focused on individuals who are early in their careers. The Ronald A. Hites Award is awarded for outstanding original research demonstrated in papers published in the Journal of the American Society for Mass Spectrometry. The Research Awards are given to young scientists in mass spectrometry, based on the evaluation of their proposed research.

Publications
Journal of the American Society for Mass Spectrometry
 Measuring Mass: From Positive Rays to Proteins

Past presidents 

The past presidents of ASMS are:

Conferences
The Society holds an annual conference in late May or early June as well as topical conferences (at Asilomar State Beach in California and Sanibel Island, Florida) and a fall workshop, which is also focused on a single topic. Conferences on Mass Spectrometry and Allied Topics have been held yearly since 1953.

See also
International Mass Spectrometry Foundation
List of female mass spectrometrists

References

External links
ASMS website

Chemistry societies
Mass spectrometry
Organizations established in 1969
1969 establishments in the United States